Eduardo Mello Borges,  Edu (born 14 October 1986), is a Brazilian born, Azerbaijani futsal player who plays for Araz Naxçivan and the Azerbaijan national futsal team.

References

External links
UEFA profile

1986 births
Living people
Futsal defenders
Azerbaijani men's futsal players
Brazilian men's futsal players
Brazilian emigrants to Azerbaijan
Araz Naxçivan players